Porntip or Pornthip is a Thai female given name.

People with the name พรทิพย์ include:

Porntip Papanai, actress and model
Pornthip Rojanasunand, doctor and human rights activist
Porntip Buranaprasertsuk, badminton player

People with the name ภรณ์ทิพย์ include:

Porntip Nakhirunkanok, also known as Bui Simon, a model who was awarded the title of Miss Universe 1988

Notes

Thai feminine given names